The Great Yenisey ( Bolshoy Yenisey;  Bii-Xem) is a river in the Republic of Tuva, the right source of the Yenisey, at its confluence with the Little Yenisey.

The name Bii-Khem in Tuvan means "big river".

Course
It flows out of Lake Kara-Balik. High water level of the river is due to the fact that the catchment area of the river includes the Todzha Basin, which relief forms a wide catchment area. The river receives numerous tributaries, the largest of them are right Toora-Khem, Khamsara, Systyg-Khem. The basin of the Bolshoy Yenisey is a mountainous region, which borders in the north and east are the administrative boundaries of Tuva with Buryatia, Irkutsk Oblast and Krasnoyarsk Krai. The river flows through the Tuva basin in its lower course. Near the city of Kyzyl it joins the Kaa-Hem, forming the Ulug-Khem, which is actually the beginning of the Upper Yenisey. The whole Todzhinsky District of the Republic of Tuva is located in the basin of the river, its centre, Toora-Khem, is located at the confluence of the Toora-Khem tributary.

Protected area
The upper course of the river is virtually untouched virgin territory, with the Azas Plateau, including nine extinct volcanoes with unique geological features. A beautiful lake Azas (its other name is Todzha) is located on the Toora-Khem tributary, the lake is one of the tourist sites of the Republic. Almost the entire lake and the area of the river are included in the Azas Federal Reserve.

See also
List of rivers of Russia

References

External links
Fishing in Russia

Rivers of Tuva
Rivers of Kyzyl